The 1962–63 Idaho Vandals men's basketball team represented the University of Idaho during the 1962–63 NCAA University Division men's basketball season. The independent Vandals were led by third-year head coach Joe Cipriano, and played their home games on campus at the Memorial Gymnasium, in Moscow, Idaho.

In his only season with the Vandals, forward/center Gus Johnson was a Northwest sensation, and led the team to a  record. Under the NCAA rules of the era, junior college transfers that had previously attended a four-year college were not allowed to play in tournaments during their first season at the new (third)  At the Far West Classic in Portland in late December, Idaho lost two of three games without him. With Johnson on the floor, the team was  entering the final weekend, but dropped two in Seattle.

Led by leading scorer Chuck White and Johnson, the Vandals were at their best in their main rivalries from the old Pacific Coast Conference:  versus Oregon,  versus Palouse neighbor Washington State, and  against Washington. The primary nemesis was Seattle University, led by guard Eddie Miles, who swept all three games, half of UI's losses. Idaho dropped its only game with Oregon State at the Far West without Johnson, but won all three with Gonzaga, for a  record against its four former PCC foes and a collective  against the six Northwest rivals. In the last season before the Big Sky Conference, the Vandals were undefeated in ten games against those teams; this included a sweep of Idaho State for the King Spud Trophy and unofficial state title.

Attendance at the Memorial Gym was consistently over-capacity, with an estimated 3,800 for home games in the cramped   of WSU on December 20 caused the region to take  The teams met nine days  later in Portland without Johnson, and Idaho had to rally from behind to win by  Johnson and center Paul Silas of Creighton waged a season-long battle to lead the NCAA in rebounding. Silas claimed this by averaging 20.6 per game, 0.3 more than  In February, a low-profile article in Sports Illustrated introduced the team to the nation.

Despite their record, the Vandals were not invited to the post-season. The NCAA tournament included only 25 teams and Oregon State and Seattle U. were selected from the Northwest. The NIT invited just twelve teams, with none from the Mountain or Pacific time zones. If Idaho had been invited, Johnson was ineligible to participate.

Aftermath
That spring, 24-year-old Johnson was the tenth overall selection in the 1963 NBA draft and went on to a hall of fame career with the Baltimore Bullets. Cipriano also moved on to coach at Nebraska for seventeen  until his death. They had a dismal  record through  and lost every game against their Northwest rivals, a collective  vs UW, WSU, UO, OSU, Seattle U., and Gonzaga.

High scorer White became a hall of fame high school head coach in Anchorage, Alaska; but both Cipriano and Johnson died before age fifty, due to  Team captain Lyle Parks earned a degree in chemical engineering, and sophomore Chuck Kozak graduated from the UI's law school

Roster

Schedule and results

References

External links
Sports Reference – Idaho Vandals: 1962–63 basketball season
Gem of the Mountains: 1963 University of Idaho yearbook – 1962–63 basketball season
Idaho Argonaut – student newspaper – 1963 editions

Idaho Vandals men's basketball seasons
Idaho
Idaho
Idaho